The Republic of Croatia Directorate General for Civil Aviation (DGCA) is a government agency of Croatia, headquartered in Zagreb. It manages aspects of civil aviation in Croatia.

References

External links

  

Aviation in Croatia
Government agencies of Croatia